Patrick Johnston may refer to:

Patrick Johnston (Canadian politician), Canadian administrator and former politician
Patrick Johnston (American politician) (born 1946), former Democratic state legislator in the State of California
Patrick Johnston (medieval courtier), Scottish courtier and producer of plays 
Patrick G. Johnston, Northern Irish academic; vice-chancellor of Queens University Belfast, 2014-2017
Sir Patrick Johnston (Scottish politician), Scottish merchant and politician

See also
Patrick Johnson (disambiguation)